Usha Kirana was an Indian Kannada language newspaper which had its headquarters in Bangalore, Karnataka.

It was established by Vijay Sankeshwar in March 2005 as a sister publication to the Vijaya Karnataka daily. Originally, the paper had several simultaneously published editions.

In 2006, the paper was sold to Bennett, Coleman & Co. Ltd., publishers of India's leading newspaper, The Times of India, along with all of its sister publications including Vijaya Karnataka.

After Bennett, Coleman & Co. took over, they closed five editions of the newspaper in September 2006 and started The Times of India'''s Kannada version. Usha Kirana'' ceased.

See also
 List of Kannada-language newspapers
 List of Kannada-language magazines
 List of newspapers in India
 Media in Karnataka
 Media of India

References

Newspapers published in Bangalore
Kannada-language newspapers
2005 establishments in Karnataka
Publications established in 2005